James Lionel Michael (October 1824 – 26 April 1868) was an Anglo-Australian solicitor and poet.

Early life
Michael was born in Red Lion Square, London, the second son of James Walter Michael, a solicitor, and his wife, Rose Lemon née Hart. 
Michael told his friend Joseph Sheridan Moore, that the passage on page 12 of John Cumberland, beginning "My earliest memory", gives an exact picture of his childhood. After visiting Europe, Michael was articled to his father and began to mix in artistic and literary society. Sheridan Moore states that Michael became friendly with Millais and Ruskin, and published a pamphlet which made some stir at the time, vindicating the position of the pre-Raphaelite brotherhood. Moore also says that though "always temperate and abstemious in his habits he had a talent for frittering away his money". This could have been one of the reasons for his migration to Australia.

Australia
Michael arrived in New South Wales on 30 July 1853 and practised as a solicitor with some success. He became friendly with Joseph Sheridan Moore who introduced him to Henry Kendall, whom he afterwards took into his office and "treated as an affectionate elder brother would a younger one". In 1857 Michael published Songs without Music, a collection of lyrics, and in 1860 John Cumberland, a long, largely autobiographical poem. In 1861 he moved to Grafton on the Clarence River and for a time practised successfully; but towards the end of his life he appears to have made enemies and was in financial difficulties. In 1864, Michael was legally separated from his wife. On the evening of Sunday 26 April 1868 Michael went for a walk dressed in a great-coat, cap and galoshes; two days later his body was found floating in the Clarence River. The medical evidence stated that there was a deep cut over the right eye "such as might be produced by falling on a broken bottle". The coroner's jury returned an open verdict, and although a set of verses Michael had written a few weeks before suggested to some people that he had contemplated suicide, the possibility of this was indignantly denied by his friend, Sheridan Moore, who declared that the evidence suggested either foul play or accident, rather than suicide. Michael married in 1854 and was survived by a son. He died heavily in debt.

Michael wrote musical verse, some of which has been included in Australian anthologies. His long poem, John Cumberland, contains some good passages, however has many patches of prose. Though a minor Australian poet, Michael's encouragement of the young Kendall gave him a special interest. His friends said he had a charming personality.

References

External links
 

1824 births
1868 deaths
Australian poets
English male poets
19th-century English poets
19th-century English male writers